Igor Papič (born 24 May 1966) is a Slovenian engineer and politician. He serves as the minister of education, science and sport of the Republic of Slovenia since 2022. In 2017, he was elected rector of the University of Ljubljana.

He is standing for re-election as Rector of the University of Ljubljana in 2021. He was runner-up to Gregor Majdič, who received 54.9% of the vote, and Igor Papič, who received 45.1% of the vote, and thus did not win a new mandate.

References 

1966 births
Living people
Freedom Movement (Slovenia) politicians
Ministers of Education and Sports of Slovenia
Science ministers of Slovenia
Slovenian politicians